Pantelis Kafes (born 24 June 1978) is a Greek former professional footballer who played as a midfielder. He was known for being one of very few outfield players to have worn the number 1 jersey and has won acclaim for his creative abilities and passing skills.

Club career

Pontioi Veria
He started playing professional football in January 1995 at the age of 17 for Pontioi Veria. The club were relegated to the third division that summer and the following May were demoted again. The one shining light was Kafes, who joined PAOK in January 1997.

PAOK
Kafes burst on to the Alpha Ethniki scene in 1998–99, scoring seven times. He continued to impress and was instrumental in PAOK's 2000–01 and 2002–03 Greek Cup triumphs. Yet his spell in Thessaloniki ended acrimoniously as he was released from his contract after a dispute over unpaid wages. Olympiacos stepped in with a three-year contract.

Olympiacos
He was ever-present in his first season at Olympiacos as they finished second in the Alpha Ethniki in 2003, and made his first UEFA Champions League appearances, five in all. Kafes played in the majority of Olympiacos' league matches on their way to the domestic double, and only a mid-season injury preventing him from matching his record in Europe, where he took part in all of the club's Champions League and UEFA Cup games. Likewise for next season, 2005–2006, where he played 22 domestic league games, earned another double and scored two truly memorable tying goals from the edge of the box for Olympiacos in the UEFA Champions League against Real Madrid. the goal of Raul at the Estadio Santiago Bernabéu. On 19 October 2005, he scored also against Olympique Lyonnais. Kafes was released from Olympiacos during 2006–07 season. A few days later he signed a 2-year contract with rival side AEK Athens.

AEK Athens
Soon after signing for AEK and continuing his tradition of wearing the number 1, Kafes broke into the first team and was a mainstay in AEK's fight for the championship, but they had to settle for second. The following season on 12 January 2008 Kafes scored his first goal for AEK against Veria. On 30 March of the same year, Kafes scored against his former club Olympiacos and put AEK 4–0 in front. AEK initially finished in first place in the Greek League, but after the court case between Apollon Kalamaria and Olympiacos for the illegal usage of a player (Roman Wallner) in the 1–0 Apollon Kalamaria win earlier in the season, Olympiacos were awarded the 3 points in a court hearing, thus finishing 2 points ahead of AEK Olympiacos. In his third season with the "Dikefalos-Aetos", AEK did not live up to their expectations and finished third, Kafes was a key figure in there revival inwich he captained the side on a few occasions. On 12 June 2009, Kafes signed a new 3-year deal which will keep him at AEK until 2012. He agreed to reduce his wages to help the club's financial difficulties. On 11 July 2009, Kafes was given the captain's armband and will be the new captain for the upcoming season. On 13 September 2009, Kafes scored his first goal of the 2009–10 season versus Iraklis. Kafes also scored 2 goals against PAS Giannina. He has made great appearances throughout the 2009–10 season, with much silent work as a defensive midfielder and some great assists to his teammates. On 30 April 2011, Kafes won the 2010–11 Greek Football Cup and scored AEK's third goal in a 3–0 win against Atromitos. Kafes scored his first goal in the 2011–12 season against Panionios in a 1–0 home win on 5 February 2012. The season was his last with AEK.

Veria
Pantelis Kafes left AEK in June. He trialed with Rangers F.C. in Scotland but did not sign with the financially troubled club. After being free agent for 2 months, on 31 August he joined back to his hometown team Veria FC. He scored his first goal with his new team 6 October 2012 against Atromitos and on 12 December 2012, he made his debut in Greek Cup with Veria FC against Thrasyvoulos and 22 December, he helped his new team to qualify for the stage and for the quarter-final of the Greek Cup. He was released during the winter break and in February 2013, he trialed with Philadelphia Union of Major League Soccer.

International career
Kafes made his debut in the national team against Croatia in April 2001 and scored his first goal against Austria in Vienna in March 2003. Kafes made two appearances in UEFA EURO 2004 qualifying, and was in the finals squad and he won Euro 2004 with Greece. Kafes participated in 2006 World Cup qualifying campaign, the 2005 FIFA Confederations Cup. Kafes has been re-called into the team from the new coach Fernando Santos during the qualification for Euro 2012. On 8 October 2010 Kafes came on as a substitute against Latvia replacing Giorgos Karagounis, helping the team to qualify for UEFA's 2012 European Football Championship tournament. This was Kafes' first competitive match under new coach Fernando Santos. On 17 November 2010, Kafes played also the second half of the friendly match against Austria, giving a big contribution, where Greece beat Austria.

Career statistics

Club

International

Scores and results list Greece's goal tally first, score column indicates score after each Kafes goal.

Honours
PAOK
 Greek Cup: 2001, 2003

Olympiacos
 Greek Championship: 2005, 2006
 Greek Cup: 2005, 2006

AEK Athens
 Greek Cup: 2011

Greece
 UEFA European Championship: 2004

References

1978 births
Living people
Footballers from Veria
Greek footballers
Greece under-21 international footballers
Greece international footballers
Association football midfielders
Veria F.C. players
AEK Athens F.C. players
Olympiacos F.C. players
PAOK FC players
UEFA Euro 2004 players
UEFA European Championship-winning players
2005 FIFA Confederations Cup players
Super League Greece players
Football League (Greece) players